Spymob is an American alternative rock band from Minneapolis, Minnesota. Best known for their appearance on the 2003 Star Trak Entertainment compilation The Neptunes present Clones, with the song "Half Steering...", they also provided backing instruments for N.E.R.D.'s 2002 debut In Search Of.... Their major label debut, Sitting Around Keeping Score, was the first rock album to be released on The Neptunes Star Trak label. In 2014, the band released their second album, Memphis independently. Additionally, all four members have provided session work and touring support for other artists including N.E.R.D, Paramore, Snoop Dogg, Kelis, and Mike Doughty.

History

Singer/keyboardist John Ostby, bassist Christian Twigg, guitarist Brent Paschke, and drummer Eric Fawcett formed in Minneapolis in the early 90s as "Reno." Playing staples such as 2040 and Kissing the Neighborhood Houses Goodbye in local venues such as the 400 Bar, the band recorded several demo songs (later released as Basement Tapes). In 2001, the band was hired to provide studio work for N.E.R.D's In Search Of... album after a copy of their demo was discovered by Pharrell Williams and Chad Hugo.

Albums

As Spymob
 Townhouse Stereo (Spymob, Inc, 1996)
 Basement Tapes (Spymob, Inc, 2001)
 Sitting Around Keeping Score (Arista/Star Trak Entertainment, 2003)
 Spymob EP (Spymob, Inc, 2005)
 Memphis (Spymob, 2014)

As backing band
 Wanderland Kelis (Virgin), 2001
 In Search Of... N.E.R.D (Virgin), 2002
 Haughty Melodic Mike Doughty (ATO Records), 2005 (Eric Fawcett)
 Seeing Sounds N.E.R.D (Interscope Records), 2008 (Eric Fawcett, Brett Paschke)

References

External links
 SoundCloud
 Facebook

Funk rock musical groups
Musical groups established in 1993
American funk metal musical groups
Musical quartets
Rock music groups from Minnesota
Musical groups from the Twin Cities